Oakland Grove Presbyterian Church is a historic Presbyterian church located at Selma, Alleghany County, Virginia.  It was built about 1847, and is a one-story, brick structure measuring 30 feet by 40 feet.  It features a molded brick cornice runs beneath the eaves of the slate covered gable roof.  It is the oldest known ecclesiastical structure in Alleghany County and is popularly regarded as one of the county's chief historic landmarks.

It was added to the National Register of Historic Places in 1982.

References

Churches completed in 1847
19th-century Presbyterian church buildings in the United States
Churches in Alleghany County, Virginia
Churches on the National Register of Historic Places in Virginia
Presbyterian churches in Virginia
National Register of Historic Places in Alleghany County, Virginia
1847 establishments in Virginia